The anti-greenhouse effect is a process that occurs when energy from a celestial object's sun is absorbed or scattered by the object's upper atmosphere, preventing that energy from reaching the surface, which results in surface cooling – the opposite of the greenhouse effect. In an ideal case where the upper atmosphere absorbs all sunlight and is nearly transparent to infrared (heat) energy from the surface, the surface temperature would be reduced by 16%, which is a significant amount of cooling. This case is described in more detail below.

Coined by Dr. Christopher McKay in 1991, the anti-greenhouse effect was first observed on Saturn's moon, Titan. In Titan's stratosphere, a haze composed of organic aerosol particles simultaneously absorbs solar radiation and is nearly transparent to infrared energy from Titan's surface. This acts to reduce solar energy reaching the surface and lets infrared energy escape, cooling Titan's surface. Titan has both a greenhouse and an anti-greenhouse effect which compete with one another. The greenhouse effect warms Titan by 21 K while the anti-greenhouse effect cools Titan by 9 K, so the net warming is 12 K (= 21 K - 9 K).

It has been suggested that Earth potentially had a similar haze in the Archean eon, causing an anti-greenhouse effect. It is theorized that this haze helped to regulate and stabilize early Earth's climate. Other atmospheric phenomena besides organic hazes act similarly to the anti-greenhouse effect, such as Earth's stratospheric ozone layer and thermosphere, particles formed and emitted from volcanoes, nuclear fallout, and dust in Mars's upper atmosphere.

Outside of the Solar system, calculations of the impact of these hazes on the thermal structure of exoplanets have been conducted.

Energy balance theory

Energy balance 
To understand how the anti-greenhouse effect impacts a planet or large moon with its host star as an external source of energy, an energy budget can be calculated, similar to how it is done for Earth. For each component in the system, incoming energy needs to equal outgoing energy to uphold the conservation of energy and remain at a constant temperature. If one energy contributor is larger than the other, there is an energy imbalance and the temperature of an object will change to reestablish a balance. Energy sources across the whole electromagnetic spectrum need to be accounted for when calculating the energy balance. In the case of Earth, for example, a balance is struck between incoming shortwave radiation from the Sun and outgoing longwave radiation from the surface and the atmosphere. After establishing a component's energy balance, a temperature can be derived.

Ideal anti-greenhouse effect 
In the most extreme case, suppose that a planet's upper atmosphere contained a haze that absorbed all sunlight which was not reflected back to space, but at the same time was nearly transparent to infrared longwave radiation. By Kirchhoff's law, since the haze is not a good absorber of infrared radiation, the haze will also not be a good emitter of infrared radiation and will emit a small amount in this part of the spectrum both out to space and towards the planet's surface. By the Stefan–Boltzmann law, the planet emits energy directly proportional to the fourth power of surface temperature. At the surface, the energy balance is as follows,

Since the haze is not a good absorber of this longwave radiation, it can be assumed to all pass through out to space. The incoming solar energy must be scaled down to account for the amount of energy that is lost by being reflected to space since it is not within the planet-atmosphere system. In the upper atmosphere, the energy balance is as follows,

The incoming solar flux is divided by four to account for time and spatial averaging over the entire planet and the  factor is the fraction of the solar energy that is absorbed by the haze.

and the ratio  equals  or 0.84. This means that the surface temperature is reduced from the effective mean radiating temperature by 16%, which is a potentially significant cooling effect. This is an ideal case and represents the maximum impact the anti-greenhouse effect can have and will not be the impact for a real planet or large moon.

On Titan

The organic haze in Titan's stratosphere absorbs 90% of the solar radiation reaching Titan, but is inefficient at trapping infrared radiation generated by the surface. This is due to Titan's atmospheric window occurring from roughly 16.5 to 25 micrometers. Although a large greenhouse effect does keep Titan at a much higher temperature than the thermal equilibrium, the anti-greenhouse effect due to the haze reduces the surface temperature by 9 K. Because the greenhouse effect due to other atmospheric components increases it by 21 K, the net effect is that the real surface temperature of Titan (94 K) is 12 K warmer than the effective temperature 82 K (which would be the surface temperature in the absence of any atmosphere, assuming constant albedo). In the ideal anti-greenhouse case described above, the maximum impact of the organic haze on Titan is (1-0.84)  82 K = 13 K. This is higher than the 9 K found on Titan.

The organic haze is formed through the polymerization of methane photolysis products and nitriles, meaning the products combine into longer chains and bigger molecules. These methane-derived polymers can be made of polycyclic aromatic hydrocarbons (PAHs) and polyacetylene. The distribution of these polymers is not vertically uniform in Titan's atmosphere, however. The nitrile and polyacetylene polymers are formed in the upper atmosphere while the PAH polymers are created in the stratosphere. These polymers then aggregate to form haze particles. The opacity to sunlight of this organic haze on Titan is determined primarily by the haze production rate. If haze production increases, opacity of the haze increases, resulting in more cooling of the surface temperature. Additionally, the presence of this organic haze is the cause of the temperature inversion in Titan's stratosphere.

On Earth
The presence of an organic haze in Earth's Archean atmosphere was first suggested in 1983 and could have been responsible for an anti-greenhouse effect. This hypothesis stems from attempts at resolving the faint young Sun paradox, where a reduced solar output in the past must be reconciled with the existence of liquid water on Earth at that time. In order to explain how water could remain in liquid form, it has been proposed that greenhouse gases helped keep Earth warm enough to prevent water from completely freezing. While one hypothesis suggests that only carbon dioxide was responsible for the additional warmth, another hypothesis includes the presence of both carbon dioxide and methane. One model found that methane in the postbiotic Archean could have existed at a mixing ratio of 1,000 ppm or higher, while the carbon dioxide could be as low as 5,000 ppm to still prevent Earth from freezing over, about 12 times the amount in 2022. However, at this 0.2 ratio of methane to carbon dioxide, products deriving from methane photolysis can polymerize to form long-chain molecules that can aggregate into particles, forming the anti-greenhouse organic haze. The haze is formed when the ratio of methane to carbon dioxide exceeds roughly 0.1. It is posited that the organic haze allowed the creation of a negative feedback loop to stabilize the climate on Archean Earth. If temperatures increased in Archean Earth, methane production would increase due to methanogens' possible preference for warmer temperatures (see thermophiles). Increasing temperatures would also increase the carbon dioxide loss through weathering due to an assumed increase in precipitation, leading to decrease carbon dioxide concentrations. This would lead to a higher methane to carbon dioxide ratio and would stimulate the production of the organic haze. This increase in organic haze production would lead to increased opacity of the atmosphere to sunlight, decreased amounts of solar energy reaching the surface, and thus decreases in surface temperature, thus negating the initial increase in surface temperature. One estimation of the anti-greenhouse effect on Archean Earth calculated the impact to be up to about 20 K in surface cooling.

In the modern state of Earth's atmosphere, there are a few sources of an anti-greenhouse effect. It has been suggested that stratospheric ozone and Earth's thermosphere create a partial anti-greenhouse effect due to their low thermal opacity and high temperatures. Additionally, ejected dust like that from volcanoes and nuclear fallout after a nuclear war has been suggested to typify an anti-greenhouse effect. Also, the formation of stratospheric sulfur aerosols from volcanic sulfur dioxide emissions has been seen to have a cooling effect on Earth that lasts approximately 1 to 2 years. All of these sources act to create a temperature structure where a hot upper layer lies above a cold surface, which typifies the anti-greenhouse effect.

Earlier discussions in the scientific community pre-dating the current definition established by Dr. Christopher McKay in 1991 referred to the anti-greenhouse effect as a precursor to the Late Precambrian glaciation, describing it more as a carbon sequestration process. This is no longer the current usage of the term, which emphasizes surface cooling due to high-altitude absorption of solar radiation.

On other planets 
There has been discussion about a weak anti-greenhouse effect on Mars, where storms carry dust into the upper atmosphere. Evidence for this effect came from Viking 1 measurements made in 1976-77 when in the aftermath of a global storm, the average daytime temperature above the ground dropped by 5 degrees Celsius.

Studies using computer simulations have investigated the impact of photochemical hazes on exoplanets' thermal structure. Applying this model to hot Jupiters, scientists found that the inclusion of haze for HD 189733 b led to an expansion of the atmosphere, helping to explain an observed steep transit signature in the electromagnetic spectrum. Also, the model for HD 209458 b predicted both photochemical haze and objects like clouds.

References

Planetary atmospheres
Atmospheric dynamics